John David Coles (7 September 1886 – 29 July 1951) was an Australian rules footballer who played with Richmond in the Victorian Football League (VFL).

Family
The son of John Joseph Coles (1855-), and Margaret Coles, née Irvine, John David Coles was born at Richmond, Victoria on 7 September 1886.

He married Olive Victoria Lavinia Queenie Black (1889-1976) in 1908.

Football

Northcote (VFA)
He played for the Northcote Football Club in the Victorian Football Association (VFA) in 1908 (2 matches), 1910 (3 matches), in 1912 (17 matches), and also played two matches for a VFA representative team in 1912.

Richmond (VFL)
He played three matches for the Richmond First XVIII; the first against Collingwood on 24 July 1909, and the last against South Melbourne on 14 August 1909.

Death
He died (suddenly) at his residence at Kew, Victoria on 29 July 1951.

Notes

References
 Hogan P: The Tigers Of Old, Richmond FC, (Melbourne), 1996.

External links 
 
 
 Jack Coles, at The VFA Project.

1886 births
1951 deaths
Australian rules footballers from Melbourne
Northcote Football Club players
Richmond Football Club players
People from Richmond, Victoria